The Texas Collection is one of the special libraries at Baylor University in Waco, Texas. Situated in the Carroll Library Building, the Texas Collection serves as a collection of various documents, items and artifacts significant to Texas history.

History
The Texas Collection, founded in 1923 by a gift of several hundred items from the personal Texas history collection of Dr. Kenneth Hazen Aynesworth, is one of the specialized libraries of Baylor University.  From its early beginnings, The Texas Collection has grown to the largest privately held collection of Texana, containing nearly 200,000 volumes, more than 3,000 current serial subscription titles, and over 13,000 audio-visual pieces. In addition, there are over 1.4 million photographs, over 3,600 oral history tapes/transcripts, approximately 15,000 maps, and over 2,500 archival collections.

The original materials, along with other Texas-related holdings of the Baylor University Library, were housed in a single room of the Carroll Library Building until 1939, at which time it was moved to occupy an entire wing on the second floor of Pat Neff Hall. By the end of another 15 years, The Texas Collection was in need of yet more space. In 1955, The Texas Collection returned home to Carroll Library building, this time with the entire third floor designated for the collection. In 1968, with the completion of the Moody Memorial Library, the general collection moved out of the Carroll Library Building, leaving three floors solely to The Texas Collection. In 1993, the University renovated the Carroll Library Building, forcing The Texas Collection into a temporary home in the basement of Roxy Grove Hall.

Print Materials
The collection of print materials contains nearly 200,000 volumes concerning Texas and Texans. The collection is strong in Texas history, genealogy, popular literature, Baptists and their institutions, religious denominations, and Texas cookery.

Print materials come in a variety of formats including books, periodicals, vertical files, microforms, and audiovisual materials.
The collection is a regional depository for Texas state documents and receives publications from state agencies. It is also a depository in the Regional Historical Records Depository program and provides these microfilmed county records for both in-house use and Inter-library loan patrons.

Manuscript Archives
The Texas Collection preserves and makes accessible manuscript collections about the diverse lives of Texans—their faith, politics, struggles, and triumphs. These daily events, recorded in the collections from before Texas’ birth as a Republic to the present, link Texas and Texans past with those of today. This rich history includes diaries, letters, photographs, and other materials on all things Texas. Collection strengths include early Texas, Baptist and missionary history, the Civil War, World War I and World War II, Branch Davidians, and the Central Texas region.

University Archives
The University Archives is Baylor University’s memory, providing insight into the rich heritage that gives context and meaning to the university’s future. Holdings include Board records, presidential papers, office/departmental records, university publications, student organization records, and other materials that are invaluable resources in documenting Baylor's past.

Photograph Collection
From daguerreotypes to digital and over two million strong, the ever expanding photographic holdings of The Texas Collection capture the lives, events, and scenery of Texas and its citizens. With emphasis on central Texas and Baylor University, holdings also include various Texas cities and parts of the U.S. Collections of several prominent central Texas photographers are also represented, such as Fred Gildersleeve. The Texas Collection is home to several thousand pieces of his photographic works.

Map Collection
The majority of maps available at The Texas Collection focus on the state of Texas.  The collection contains over 17,000 maps  that show the geographic region through its various transitions into the present day state. The map collection in housed in the Frances C. Poage Map room on the second floor of Carroll Library at Baylor University, a gift from former Congressman W. R. Poage.

Collections
Collection holdings include:
          
Pat Neff
Jules Bledsoe
Ruth Montgomery
Leon Jaworski
Dorothy Scarborough
Madison Cooper
Grant Teaff
Samuel Palmer Brooks
Lawrence Sullivan Ross
Branch Davidians
Gordon Kidd Teal
Elisabet Ney
Rufus Columbus Burleson
Audie Murphy
American Association of University Women
Richard Coke
             
Vivienne Malone-Mayes
Jacob De Cordova
Camp MacArthur
William Cowper Brann
American Civil War
World War II
Fort Parker
William Carey Crane
Abner Vernon McCall
Oscar Henry Cooper
George Washington Baines
Robert B. Sloan
Independence, Texas
Texas, Our Texas
American Association of University Professors
Clark W. Thompson (Texas politician)

References

Baylor University
Libraries in Waco, Texas
1923 establishments in Texas